Rip, Sew and Stitch is a 1953 short subject directed by Jules White starring American slapstick comedy team The Three Stooges (Moe Howard, Larry Fine and Shemp Howard). It is the 150th entry in the series released by Columbia Pictures starring the comedians, who released 190 shorts for the studio between 1934 and 1959.

Plot 
The Stooges operate a tailor shop that is about to be repossessed by the Skin and Flint Finance Corporation. When the boys hear about a big reward for fugitive bank robber Terry "Slippery Fingered" Hargan (Harold Brauer), they think that catching him might end their financial woes. Hargan conveniently ducks into their shop and leaves a suit jacket with a safe combination in its pocket. After quietly sneaking back into the shop while the Stooges are elsewhere searching for clues, Hargan snatches a handful of suit jackets in hopes of retrieving the combination. He then later returns with his henchmen, and a wild mêlée follows. The Stooges end up getting the reward to pay off their debts and, with a stroke of luck, wind up with the crook's bankroll as well.

Cast

Credited
 Moe Howard as Moe
 Larry Fine as Larry
 Shemp Howard as Shemp

Uncredited
 Vernon Dent as Detective Sharp
 Harold Brauer as Terry Hargen
 Harold Kening as Terry Hargen (double of Harold Brauer in new footage)
 Cy Schindell as Henchman
 Bing Connolly as Henchman
 Phil Arnold as Customer with shredded jacket
 Jules White as voice of Radio announcer

Production notes
Rip, Sew and Stitch is a remake of 1947's Sing a Song of Six Pants using ample stock footage. New footage was filmed on October 14, 1952. A double is used for Harold Brauer in the new footage and short's director Jules White redubbed his original voice change to sound older.

References

External links 
 
Rip, Sew and Stitch at threestooges.net

1953 films
1953 comedy films
The Three Stooges films
American black-and-white films
The Three Stooges film remakes
Films directed by Jules White
Columbia Pictures short films
American comedy short films
1950s English-language films
1950s American films